Abdullah I may refer to:

Abdullah ibn Muhammad al-Umawi (844–912), Emir of Córdoba
Abdullah I of the Maldives, Sultan of the Maldives from 1374 to 1376
Abdullah I Al-Sabah (1740–1814)
Abdullah bin Saud, leader of the House of Saud from 1814 to 1818
Abdullah I of Jordan (1882–1951), emir of Transjordan (1921–1946), then King of Transjordan (1946–1949), then King of the Hashemite Kingdom of Jordan (1949–1951)

See also 
 Abdullah II (disambiguation)
 King Abdullah (disambiguation)
 Abdullah Khan (disambiguation)
 Abdullah (name)
 Abdullah (disambiguation)